The badminton tournament at the 2007 Southeast Asian Games was held from 8 December to 14 December in the Nakhon Ratchasima Province of Thailand.

Participating nations

 
 
 
 
 
 
 
 

There was no participation from Brunei, Myanmar, and Timor Leste.

Medal tally

Medalists

Men's Badminton

Team

Singles

Singapore's Derek Wong replaced Ronald Susilo, who withdraw due to an injury.

Doubles

Women's Badminton

Team

Singles

Wong Mew Choo pulled out of the event because of back injury and was replaced by Lydia Cheah

Doubles

Mixed

Doubles

External links
2007 SEA Games Official Site: Badminton

Badminton
Southeast Asian Games
Multi-sport events, Southeast Asian Games